Chrysanthrax is a genus of bee flies in the family Bombyliidae.

Species

Chrysanthrax adumbrata (Coquillett, 1887)
Chrysanthrax albicomus Tabet & Hall, 1987
Chrysanthrax altus (Tucker, 1907)
Chrysanthrax anna (Coquillett, 1887)
Chrysanthrax arenarius (Hall, 1976)
Chrysanthrax arenosus (Coquillett, 1892)
Chrysanthrax argentosus (Painter, 1933
Chrysanthrax arizonensis (Coquillett, 1887)
Chrysanthrax astarte (Wiedemann, 1830)
Chrysanthrax atratus (Coquillett, 1887)
Chrysanthrax caliginosus Evenhuis & Greathead, 1999
Chrysanthrax cautor (Coquillett, 1887)
Chrysanthrax cerius (Williston, 1901)
Chrysanthrax cinefactus (Coquillett, 1892)
Chrysanthrax compressus (Painter, 1926)
Chrysanthrax conclusa (Walker, 1857)
Chrysanthrax crocinus (Coquillett, 1892)
Chrysanthrax cypris (Meigen, 1820)
Chrysanthrax dichotomus (Schiner, 1868)
Chrysanthrax dimidiata (Wiedemann, 1819)
Chrysanthrax dispar (Coquillett, 1887)
Chrysanthrax edititius (Say, 1829)
Chrysanthrax eudorus (Coquillett, 1887)
Chrysanthrax hircinus (Coquillett, 1892)
Chrysanthrax ioptera (Wiedemann, 1828)
Chrysanthrax juncturus (Coquillett, 1887)
Chrysanthrax lepidotoides (Johnson, 1919)
Chrysanthrax leviculus (Coquillett, 1894)
Chrysanthrax melasoma (Wulp, 1882)
Chrysanthrax meridionalis (Cole, 1923)
Chrysanthrax multicolor (Bigot, 1892)
Chrysanthrax nivea Cole, 1923
Chrysanthrax pallidulus (Coquillett, 1894)
Chrysanthrax panamensis Evenhuis & Greathead, 1999
Chrysanthrax partita Tabet & Hall, 1987
Chrysanthrax pennyi Evenhuis, 2017
Chrysanthrax petalonyx Tabet & Hall, 1987
Chrysanthrax primitivus (Walker, 1849)
Chrysanthrax procedens (Walker, 1852)
Chrysanthrax quadripunctata Cole, 1923
Chrysanthrax restitutus (Walker, 1852)
Chrysanthrax sackeniana (Williston, 1901)
Chrysanthrax scitulus (Coquillett, 1887)
Chrysanthrax semilugens (Philippi, 1865)
Chrysanthrax subandinus (Philippi, 1865)
Chrysanthrax tantillus (Coquillett, 1892)
Chrysanthrax telluris (Coquillett, 1892)
Chrysanthrax turbatus (Coquillett, 1887)
Chrysanthrax unicincta (Bigot, 1892)
Chrysanthrax vanus (Coquillett, 1887)
Chrysanthrax variatus (Coquillett, 1892)
Chrysanthrax vastus (Coquillett, 1892)
Chrysanthrax vulpinus (Coquillett, 1892)
Chrysanthrax yaqui (Painter, 1962)

References

Bombyliidae
Brachycera genera
Taxa named by Carl Robert Osten-Sacken